Jill Valentine is a character in Resident Evil (Biohazard in Japan), a survival horror game series created by the Japanese company Capcom. She was introduced as one of two player characters in the original Resident Evil (1996). Valentine is a former member of the Raccoon City Police Department's S.T.A.R.S team, and works alongside her partner Chris Redfield to fight the Umbrella Corporation, a pharmaceutical company whose bioterrorism creates zombies and other bio-organic weapons. Jill and Chris Redfield later become founding members of the United Nations' Bioterrorism Security Assessment Alliance (B.S.A.A).

Valentine is the protagonist of several Resident Evil games, novelizations, movies, and other media. In later games, such as the 2002 Resident Evil remake, Resident Evil: The Umbrella Chronicles, and Resident Evil 5, her features were based on Canadian model and actress Julia Voth. Valentine also appears in the Resident Evil film series, portrayed by actress Sienna Guillory, and in the 2021 film reboot, played by Hannah John-Kamen. She is featured in several other game franchises, including Street Fighter, Marvel vs. Capcom, and Project X Zone.

Video game publications listed Valentine among the most popular and iconic video game characters, and praised her as the most likable and consistent Resident Evil character. She has received both acclaim and criticism with regard to gender representation in video games. Several publications praised the series for its portrayal of women and considered Valentine significantly less sexualized than other female game characters; she was also cited as an example of a female character who was as competent and skilled as her male counterparts. Others argued she was weakened as a protagonist by attributes that undermined her role as a heroine, specifically an unrealistic body shape that did not reflect her military background; some of her overtly sexualized costumes have also been criticized.

Concept and design

Jill Valentine was introduced as one of two playable protagonists, alongside her partner Chris Redfield, in Capcom's 1996 survival horror video game Resident Evil. She was created by director Shinji Mikami and designer Isao Ohishi. To avoid the sexual objectification of women in video games, Mikami refused to eroticize or portray women as submissive in Resident Evil; instead, Valentine was characterized as independent.

Of Japanese and French descent, Valentine excelled at bomb disposal during her training with Delta Force, and later joined the Special Tactics and Rescue Service (STARS) special operations unit. Experienced with weapons, explosives material, and lock picking, she was intelligent, brave, and loyal. Although their storylines progress toward "the same general direction", the gameplay differs for Valentine and Redfield; her inventory is larger, and she has a lock pick, giving her early access to more health and ammunition. Based on these differences, Valentine was recommended to first-time players of Resident Evil.

According to digital media scholar Esther MacCallum-Stewart, Mikami's female roles possess unique qualities making them viable choices for players to select over their male counterparts, and said their combat attire helped them avoid criticism of adhering to the male gaze. Mikami explained: "I don't know if I've put more emphasis on women characters, but when I do introduce them, it is never as objects. In [other] games, they will be peripheral characters with ridiculous breast physics. I avoid that sort of obvious eroticism." Despite this, subsequent games in the series not directed by Mikami depicted her wearing revealing costumes. Media scholars said players have been intentionally encouraged to both objectify and identify with the character. Several commentators suggested that Mikami's initial portrayal of Valentine as a military professional tempered the ability of subsequent game directors to overtly sexualize the character.

Valentine continued to be redesigned over the course of the series.  In the 2002 remake of the original game, her appearance was based on Canadian model and actress Julia Voth. Capcom producer Hiroyuki Kobayashi said they made her more kawaii in the remake, but also kept her tough and muscular. Voth's likeness was reused for Resident Evil: The Umbrella Chronicles (2007) and Resident Evil 5 (2009). Resident Evil 5 features Redfield as a protagonist; designers opted to focus on how both characters had aged since the original game. Valentine underwent another redesign for Resident Evil 5 to reflect her status as a test subject in biological research experiments. Depicted with blonde hair, pale skin, and tight-fitting outfitdescribed as a battle suitthese changes represent the effects of the experimentation. Fans criticized the new appearance as an example of whitewashing. MacCallum-Stewart suggested the popularity of the series was damaged by the unexplained reappearance of Valentine as a "mind-controlled BDSM assassin". In the 2020 remake of Resident Evil 3, Jill is modeled after Russian model Sasha Zotova. Jill's redesign reflects the developers' creative vision behind the character's reimagination as a genuine action hero; because the art direction for the remake is based on photorealism, Capcom wanted to ensure that Jill fits into the game world environment.

Alternate costumes as rewards for players have been a staple of the Resident Evil series. Completing the 2002 remake unlocked the ability to dress Valentine in her Resident Evil 3: Nemesis miniskirt costume and as Sarah Connor from the 1991 film Terminator 2: Judgment Day. The miniskirt was added during development upon the staff's request. Following its addition, developers changed camera angles to reduce the amount of upskirting and matched the color of the skirt and underwear to make it less obvious. The outfit reappears in Resident Evil: The Mercenaries 3D (2011). A prequel to the events of Resident Evil 5, the downloadable content (DLC) episode Lost in Nightmares includes an alternative outfit for Valentine, based on military clothing and sportswear. Since Resident Evil: Revelations (2012) was set at sea, her costume was made to resemble a wetsuit. The initial design featured more tactical gear attached to her buoyancy control device, but it was removed to highlight her body's contours. Her alternate outfit in the game, a revealing pirate costume, was deliberately made to be colorful to contrast with the storyline's dark themes.

Voice-over and live-action actresses
The actresses who appeared in the original game's live-action cutscenes and recorded the voice work were credited only by their first names; Valentine was portrayed by a high school student credited as "Inezh". Over the course of the franchise, voice actresses who played Valentine included Catherine Disher in Resident Evil 3, Heidi Anderson in the 2002 remake, Kathleen Barr in Capcom's 2004 action-adventure game Under the Skin, and Tara Platt in Pachislot Biohazard, a recreational arcade game released solely in Japan. Patricia Ja Lee provided the voice and motion capture for both The Umbrella Chronicles and Resident Evil 5. Kari Wahlgren voiced the character in the 2011 game Marvel vs. Capcom 3: Fate of Two Worlds. In Revelations, Valentine was voiced by Michelle Ruff, who returned for the non-canon game Resident Evil: Operation Raccoon City. Nicole Tompkins voiced and provided motion capture performance for Valentine in the 2020 Resident Evil 3 remake. Atsuko Yuya voiced Valentine in the Japanese versions of the games.

The character appeared in three entries of the original Resident Evil film series, where she was portrayed by English actress Sienna Guillory. Hannah John-Kamen is cast in the role for the 2021 film Resident Evil: Welcome to Raccoon City.

Appearances

In Resident Evil series

Every game in the series is set in the fictional American metropolitan area Raccoon City until its destruction at the end of Resident Evil 3: Nemesis. Subsequent games featuring Valentine take place on an international scale: namely Russia, Africa, and the Mediterranean Sea. The original game is set in July 1998 in a mansion on the outskirts of Raccoon City, which Valentine and her team enter into while searching for colleagues. Working with partner Barry Burton, she discovers the property is a façade for a biological warfare laboratory operated by the Umbrella Corporation and its undead occupants are the scientists who developed the T-virus mutagen. Her commander Albert Wesker is revealed to be a double agent for Umbrella. Valentine and Redfield are among the five survivors of the incident, who form a strong friendship and become passionate opponents of bioterrorism.

Valentine did not appear in Resident Evil 2 (1998), as the production team used new protagonists (Leon S. Kennedy and Claire Redfield) to preserve the original game's horror elements: Mikami believed Valentine and Chris Redfield would be too experienced to be scared by the events in the sequel. She returned as the sole protagonist in Resident Evil 3 (1999). Mikami – the lead producer of both Nemesis and the concurrently-produced Resident Evil – Code: Veronica (2000) – wanted each game to highlight a female character who had previously appeared in the series; Valentine is the protagonist in Nemesis, while Claire Redfield is the lead character in Code: Veronica. Commentators suggested these decisions were made as a result of the success of the Tomb Raider series, which featured Lara Croft as the protagonist.

Nemesis is set two months after the first game, during which time Valentine joined the Raccoon City Police Department (RCPD) to protect as many civilians as possible from the T-virus. The reason given by Capcom for her informal clothing in this entry was her resignation from the police immediately before the city's population was infected with the virus. She quit in protest over the failure of law enforcement to take action against Umbrella but remained in the city to investigate the corporation. The police uniform she wore in the original game was replaced with a less formal blue tube top, black miniskirt and knee-high boots.

In Nemesis, she escapes Raccoon City before its destruction from a nuclear strike as part of a U.S. government cover-up. She is pursued by Nemesis, a supersoldier whose task is to kill all remaining members of the STARS team. Instead of killing Valentine, Nemesis infects her with the T-virus; her new partner Carlos Oliveira – a former Umbrella mercenary – cures her of the infection with an Umbrella-produced vaccine. The Umbrella Chronicles occurs in 2003, when Valentine and Redfield join a private organization with the goal of exposing Umbrella's biological warfare activities, leading a group to destroy their only remaining research facility. After the fall of the corporation, the pair become founding members of the United Nations' Bioterrorism Security Assessment Alliance (BSAA). In Revelations – set two years later – Valentine and new partner Parker Luciani are sent on a mission to rescue Redfield, who is allegedly being held hostage on a ghost ship in the Mediterranean. Once aboard, she discovers the ship is infested with a new type of mutagen capable of infecting the aquatic ecosystem. Valentine and Redfield then unravel a political conspiracy involving an earlier mutagenic outbreak and a botched investigation by a rival agency.

Resident Evil 5 takes place in 2009 in the fictional African town of Kijuju, where terrorists are turning local residents into zombies. One of these terrorists is revealed to be Valentine, who was missing in action for the previous two and a half years. Set in 2006, the Lost in Nightmares DLC showed Valentine and Redfield searching inside a mansion for Umbrella's founder; to save Redfield from Wesker, Valentine tackled the latter through a window. Neither of their bodies were recovered, and Valentine is declared dead. In fact, she was injured by the fall and taken hostage by Wesker, who then used her as a test subject in his biological experiments. The antibodies produced by Valentine's system as a result of her Nemesis-era T-virus infection were used as the basis for the Uroboros Virus, the catalyst for the events of Resident Evil 5.

During Resident Evil 5, Redfield discovers that Valentine is alive; Wesker attached a mind-control device on Valentine which forced her to commit the terrorist acts and fight Redfield and his new partner, local BSAA agent Sheva Alomar. Valentine finds enough self-control to open her outfit so the device can be seen and removed. After its removal, she explains that she knew what she was doing but was unable to control her actions and urges Redfield and Alomar to continue their mission. Another DLC episode, Desperate Escape, describes how Valentine was able to escape safety with the help of local BSAA agent Josh Stone before they aid both Chris and Sheva to kill Wesker.

Other appearances

Valentine features in several of the Resident Evil films. She was originally scheduled to be the protagonist for the first Resident Evil movie (2002), while it was under the direction of George A. Romero. When Paul W. S. Anderson took over from Romero, he created a new character for the film series, Alice, portrayed by Milla Jovovich. Valentine appears in the 2004 sequel Resident Evil: Apocalypse, where she is a disgraced police officer who escapes the ruins of Raccoon City with the help of Alice and other survivors. Her outfit in the movie is based on her clothing from Resident Evil 3. Anderson considered explanations to justify the usage of the costume, such as having it described as an undercover outfit, while Jovovich suggested using a heat wave as the reason. Anderson eventually decided to ignore the issue altogether, arguing that people who would criticize her attire "probably shouldn't be watching a Resident Evil movie [at all]."

Valentine appears in a post-credits scene in Resident Evil: Afterlife (2010), wearing the mind-controlling device from Resident Evil 5 and leading an attack against Alice, Chris, Claire Redfield, and the survivors they rescued after a virus outbreak in Los Angeles. In Resident Evil: Retribution (2012), Valentine is an antagonist programmed to capture Alice, but regains control of herself after Alice removes Wesker's mind-control device. The film includes a fight between Valentine and Alice containing around 200 moves. She did not appear in the final film, Resident Evil: The Final Chapter (2016), apparently dying offscreen. According to Jovovich, Valentine was excluded because there were too many Resident Evil characters to include in the film. The Resident Evil film series consistently received negative reviews. Cinefantastique praised Guillory's performance in Apocalypse as the film's only highlight. In the reboot film Resident Evil: Welcome to Raccoon City (2021), Jill is played by Hannah John-Kamen. She will also appear in the upcoming 2023 computer-animated film,  Resident Evil: Death Island.

Valentine is a playable character in several non-canon Resident Evil games. She features in numerous Resident Evil mobile games, and is the protagonist of Resident Evil: Genesis (2008), an alternative-story version of the original game. She appears in two games in the Marvel vs. Capcom franchise and the crossover tactical role-playing games Project X Zone and Project X Zone 2. She makes a brief cameo in 2004's Under the Skin, and is a playable character in We Love Golf! (2007), Dead by Daylight (2016) and the digital collectible card game Teppen (2019). She appears as an alternate skin for two characters in the Street Fighter series: alternate outfits for Chun-Li in Super Gem Fighter Mini Mix (1998) and Cammy in Street Fighter V (2016) shows them wearing Valentine's costume from the original Resident Evil. Jill appears as a Spirit in the Nintendo crossover video game Super Smash Bros. Ultimate (2018). In 2020, Jill made a cameo appearance in Astro's Playroom. In March 2021 during the Resident Evil 25th anniversary celebrations, the character Zofia from Rainbow Six Siege received Jill Valentine's skin. In October 2021, Jill and Chris appeared in Fortnite Battle Royale.

Valentine features in novelizations of the films and games and plays a supporting role in the first novel, Resident Evil: Caliban Cove (1998), in a series by S. D. Perry. In Resident Evil: The Umbrella Conspiracy (1998), Perry's novelization of the original game, Valentine's Delta Force background is not mentioned; before her career in law enforcement, she is said to have acted as an accomplice for her father Dick Valentine, a professional thief. Several comic books based on the games were released, and she is a character in Bandai's Resident Evil Deck Building Card Game (2011). Merchandise featuring Valentine include action figures and figurines. The character was featured in Resident Evil-themed attractions at Universal  Studios Japan and Universal Orlando's Halloween Horror Nights. Capcom's themed restaurant Biohazard Cafe & Grill S.T.A.R.S., which opened in Shibuya, Tokyo, in 2012, sold a noodle dish named after her.

Reception and legacy

Game publications, including the 2011 version of the Guinness World Records Gamer's Edition, listed Valentine among the most popular and iconic video game characters. At the 2013 Penny Arcade Expo, journalists and game developers nominated her as one of the top-three lead characters of Western and Japanese role-playing video games. Magazines praised her as the most likable Resident Evil character, with the most believable and consistent story arc in the series. She was also identified as one of the all-time greatest mascots of the video game industry, as a tough, strong and attractive female character who could appeal to a broad demographic.

Critics commented that Valentine was not oversexualized in her initial appearances. She was highlighted as an example of the series' female characters who were not judged solely on gender, and for having "the most sensible design" for a female character of the mid-to-late 1990s. Her professional relationship with Redfield was celebrated for its basis in loyalty rather than romance and its balance in their personalities: Valentine's intellect and Redfield's brawn. Female digital critics felt that several of Valentine's features undermine her role as a heroine and weaken her as a protagonistspecifically that her body shape is unrealistic and not reflective of her military background or physical training, noting that she was the only member of her team in the original game not to wear a bulletproof vest. The extent to which her appearance changed over the course of the game series has been criticized as excessive, with the Resident Evil 3 outfit derided for deviating too much from Mikami's initial militaristic iteration of the character. In Tropes vs. Women in Video Games, feminist media critic Anita Sarkeesian criticized Valentine's alternate costumes as too revealing, particularly the pirate costume in Resident Evil: Revelations. She also cited Valentine's movement in Revelations as an example of female characters who walk in an overtly sexualized manner.

MacCallum-Stewart said the first Resident Evil game became famous for its "extremely clunky dialogue and voice acting, an element which lent the otherwise suspenseful game an element of charm that endeared it to players". Although she explains that the weak dialogue might be attributed to poor translation of the original Japanese text, she said this inadvertently helped differentiate the series from its rivals. Several lines from the game achieved enduring popularity: "You were almost a Jill sandwich", a quip delivered in awkward voiceover by Barry Burton after a falling ceiling trap almost crushes Valentine, was revived as an Internet meme a decade after the game's release; it became the subject of fan art depicting Valentine in or as a sandwich. Capcom referenced the line in several of their later games, including Dead Rising (2006), Resident Evil: Uprising (2009), and Resident Evil: Revelations 2 (2015). Another piece of dialogue spoken by Burton – "And, Jill, here's a lock pick. It might be handy if you, the master of unlocking, take it with you" – also gained notoriety. The quote has been parodied for containing an excessive amount of silence between words. It was removed from later editions.

Notes

References

Works cited

Further reading

External links

 Jill Valentine at the Internet Movie Database (archived)

Action film characters
Capcom protagonists
Characters in American novels of the 20th century
Cryonically preserved characters in video games
Female horror film characters
Female characters in video games
Fictional American people in video games
Fictional American police officers
Fictional Eurasian people
Fictional European-American people
Fictional female gunfighters
Fictional gunfighters in video games
Fictional female martial artists
Fictional Japanese American people
Fictional martial artists in video games
Fictional police officers in video games
Fictional private military members
Fictional soldiers in video games
Fictional sole survivors
Fictional special forces personnel
Fictional super soldiers
Fictional United Nations personnel
Fictional United States Army Delta Force personnel
Fictional zombie hunters
Resident Evil characters
Science fiction film characters
Video game bosses
Video game characters based on real people
Video game characters introduced in 1996
Video game characters who can teleport
Video game mascots
Woman soldier and warrior characters in video games